Mullafernaghan railway station was on the Banbridge, Lisburn and Belfast Railway which ran from Knockmore Junction to Banbridge in Northern Ireland. It served the village of Mullafernaghan, and the neighbouring villages of Blackskull and Donaghcloney.

History

The station was opened on 1 August 1863. It closed on 30 April 1956.

It had one platform with a brick waiting room, a siding, and a goods shed.

The station today 
Today the station is in private ownership. The waiting room and goods shed have been converted to accommodation, whilst part of the platform, as well as the abutments for the bridge over the Mullafernaghan Road, still stand.

External links 
 https://www.flickr.com/photos/mjyrailphotos/15673974893/in/photolist-s4k3Lh-rp6rya-rp6qKM-s4k4iu-skRMne-rp6rex-skK1Fd-rp6qY2-fikFCb-pT4dEr

References 

Disused railway stations in County Down
Railway stations opened in 1863
Railway stations closed in 1956
1863 establishments in Ireland
1956 disestablishments in Northern Ireland
Railway stations in Northern Ireland opened in the 19th century